Neosybra is a genus of beetles in the family Cerambycidae, containing the following species:

 Neosybra clarkei Breuning, 1974
 Neosybra congoana Breuning, 1940
 Neosybra costata (Matsushita, 1933)
 Neosybra costipennis Breuning, 1957
 Neosybra cribrella (Bates, 1873)
 Neosybra cylindracea Breuning, 1940
 Neosybra cylindrica Breuning, 1939
 Neosybra elongatissima Breuning, 1939
 Neosybra excisa Breuning, 1939
 Neosybra flavovittata Breuning, 1954
 Neosybra flavovittipennis Breuning, 1963
 Neosybra fuscosignata Breuning, 1940
 Neosybra granulipennis Breuning, 1954
 Neosybra hachijoensis (Hayashi, 1961)
 Neosybra imitans Breuning, 1940
 Neosybra kenyensis Breuning, 1960
 Neosybra mabokensis Breuning, 1977
 Neosybra meridionalis Hunt & Breuning, 1957
 Neosybra mizoguchii Hayashi, 1956
 Neosybra ochreovittata Breuning, 1939
 Neosybra ropicoides Breuning
 Neosybra rotundipennis Breuning, 1939
 Neosybra ryukyuensis Breuning & Ohbayashi, 1964
 Neosybra sinuicosta Gressitt, 1951
 Neosybra strandi Breuning, 1939

References

 
Cerambycidae genera
Taxa named by Stephan von Breuning (entomologist)